Jerome Richard Krause (April 6, 1939 – March 21, 2017) was an American sports scout and executive who was the general manager of the Chicago Bulls in the National Basketball Association (NBA) from 1985 to 2003.

His tenure with the Bulls included their six NBA championships between 1991 and 1998, led by superstar player Michael Jordan. Krause received the NBA Executive of the Year Award in 1988 and 1996. He was posthumously inducted into the Basketball Hall of Fame in 2017. His career in sports included positions as a scout or general manager for the Baltimore Bullets, Chicago White Sox, and the Chicago Bulls.

Early career
Krause was born in 1939 to a Jewish family and grew up in Chicago. He played high school baseball as a catcher at Taft High School in Chicago and attended Bradley University.

After college he went to work as a scout with the Baltimore Bullets. Early on Krause gained a reputation of being able to eye talent. He is credited by some for discovering future Hall of Famer Earl Monroe.

While with the Bullets he urged the team to pick North Dakota forward Phil Jackson in the 1967 NBA draft. The Bullets did not draft him, but Krause continued to keep in touch during Jackson's playing career and into his first years as a coach. Their relationship flourished during the 1970s and 1980s; notably, when Jackson was coaching the Albany Patroons in the Continental Basketball Association, Krause once called him requesting an analysis of the league's players, which Jackson provided in great detail.

After a few years with Baltimore, Krause worked as a scout with the Phoenix Suns, Philadelphia 76ers, Los Angeles Lakers, and Chicago Bulls in the 1970s.

Krause also worked as a baseball scout. He worked in the 1970s for the Cleveland Indians, Oakland Athletics, Seattle Mariners, and Chicago White Sox. While working for the Mariners, Krause continued to scout part time for the Lakers. He scouted for the White Sox until 1984.

Chicago Bulls GM
Krause replaced Rod Thorn as Chicago Bulls General Manager ahead of the 1985–86 NBA season.

Coaching staff
His first hire was longtime personal friend Tex Winter as a Bulls assistant bench coach. Krause urged Winter to teach all of the Bulls players, especially Michael Jordan, the Triangle Offense. Winter learned the triangle offense as a college player at USC under then head coach Sam Barry, and later used it to successfully guide the Kansas State University Wildcats to a number one ranking, topping both national college basketball polls during the 1958-59 regular season and also leading the program to two Final Four appearances as their head coach. Krause even had to fire then Bulls head coach Doug Collins and replace him with assistant coach Phil Jackson because Collins would not let Winter do as Krause had instructed.

Building the 1991–93 roster
At the time Krause took over as general manager, he already had on the team Michael Jordan and John Paxson — two of the five players who would become key parts of the team that would win three consecutive championships from 1991 to 1993. Krause made a number of moves that began building the foundation for future success. He turned over the Bulls roster and built up a collection of draft picks, although the moves in 1985 and 1986 were not particularly noteworthy. Krause selected forward Brad Sellers in the first round of the 1986 NBA draft, but Sellers did not garner significant playing time, and was traded after three seasons.  It was in the 1987 NBA draft that Krause drafted power forward Horace Grant and traded draft pick Olden Polynice, a center, for Seattle's 1st Round draft pick — Scottie Pippen, a small forward. The two were, along with Jordan, cornerstones of the Bulls' 1991–1993 championship teams. The 1988 draft failed to yield much, as first-round pick Will Perdue failed to develop as hoped; however, a 1988 trade for center Bill Cartwright provided the Bulls with the starting center they needed.

By 1988, the Bulls had assembled their starting five players (guards Jordan and Paxson, forwards Pippen and Grant, and center Cartwright) for the team that would reach five consecutive Eastern Conference finals from 1989–93, and win three consecutive NBA Finals from 1991–93. Krause continued in 1989 and 1990 to add some important depth to the roster. The Bulls picked B. J. Armstrong in the 1989 NBA draft, although first round pick Stacey King played only a reserve role. Their 1990 NBA draft pick Toni Kukoč failed to provide an immediate impact, as he continued playing professionally in Europe instead of joining the Bulls; however, the Bulls picked up undrafted big man Scott Williams.

Building the 1996–98 roster
The first retirement of Jordan, following the 1993 NBA season, brought massive change to the Chicago Bulls roster. 
Krause attempted to replace Jordan with defensive specialist Pete Myers and free agent Ron Harper, but neither proved capable of leading Chicago to a championship, although Harper played an invaluable role in the second "three-peat". Just before Jordan announced his retirement, Krause was finally able to persuade Kukoč to buy himself out of his European contract and join the Bulls. The 1993–94 Bulls made it to the conference semi-finals, where they lost to the New York Knicks in seven games. The Bulls had beaten the Knicks in the playoffs the three previous years.

During the 1993–94 NBA season, Stacey King was traded to the Minnesota Timberwolves in exchange for 7'2" center Luc Longley. Longley's emergence for the Bulls during the 1994–95 season made Will Perdue expendable. Just before the start of the 1995–96 season, Perdue was traded to the San Antonio Spurs for Dennis Rodman.

When Jordan returned to the NBA at the end of the 1995 season, Krause once again went to work in assembling what has been labeled the best team in NBA history, after the offseason acquisition of Dennis Rodman. The Bulls won a then-NBA record 72 games, and Krause was named Executive of the Year for the second time. The next year, they achieved a then second best-ever NBA season with 69 wins and repeated as champions.

Jordan criticism of Krause
Krause planned on selecting tall forward Brad Sellers in the 1986 NBA draft. Sellers, Krause reasoned, handled the ball very well for a big man, and also had a solid outside jumper. Jordan, on the other hand, pushed management to take  Johnny Dawkins, a two-way guard from Duke.  It looked as though Krause would take Dawkins even as late as the morning of the draft; the coaches and players had made it clear that they wanted him and not Sellers, and Krause did not particularly have a problem with Dawkins' game. The Bulls' head coach at the time, Doug Collins, even told Duke coach Mike Krzyzewski the night before the draft that the team would pick Dawkins. However, Krause picked Sellers anyway, and spent the summer trying to sell him to Jordan. Jordan went after Sellers mercilessly in practice, and Sellers was traded after three seasons.

Krause made another transaction in 1988 to which Jordan strongly objected. It was clear that the Bulls needed a center if they were to contend for a title, so Krause dealt Charles Oakley to New York for Bill Cartwright. Oakley, who happened to be Jordan's best friend on the team, was extremely tough, particularly on the boards and on defense. When the Pistons came after Jordan with their physical players, Oakley was his bodyguard. Cartwright was a true center, unlike the power forward Oakley, but was much older. Although Cartwright did not have Oakley's reputation as a lockdown defender, he was very effective at preventing opposing centers from dominating games, and was a more capable inside scorer. Jordan despised the trade, not only because of the players involved but also because of how they learned of it: via television, while he and Oakley were on their way to Las Vegas to see a Mike Tyson fight. Cartwright turned out to be everything the Bulls needed, however, providing a presence in the middle for all three Bulls championships from 1991–1993. Perhaps most importantly, Cartwright proved to be the league's best center at defending Patrick Ewing, the New York Knicks' star who was the key player on the Bulls' most important early-1990s conference rival.

In the 1992 Olympics, when the Dream Team, including Jordan and Pippen, took on Croatia for the gold medal, the Croatia team featured Toni Kukoč, a young star whom Krause had discovered through European contacts and was courting to a degree that some of the Bulls found annoying. Jordan biographer David Halberstam said that Jordan and Pippen "seemed to play against Kukoc as if they had a vendetta", and that "in the end, it was as if they had been playing not against Kukoc but against Krause." Jordan was later quoted as saying: "The trade of Oakley was good, and the best thing he did was to get Pippen and Grant. That's it."

Jordan later admitted that he may have been wrong and Krause may have been right about the trade for Cartwright, but it changed nothing about Jordan's overall distrust and loathing for Krause. These feelings came to the surface in many different ways, including Jordan nicknaming Krause "Crumbs" in reference to his morbid obesity and slovenly appearance, as well as having doughnut residue on his clothes.

1997–98 season

Krause and head coach Phil Jackson had been friends for years, but their relationship was, in Jackson's opinion, shattered early in the 1990s after Chicago Tribune reporter Sam Smith (whom Krause despised) published a book on the 1991 title team, The Jordan Rules. The book detailed the tension that already existed between Krause and the players, and ultimately drove a wedge between Krause and Jackson. Regardless of the success Jackson had as head coach of the Bulls, the tension between Jackson and Krause grew in the succeeding years, and by the 1997–98 season, was especially high, illustrated by several incidents. During the summer of 1997, Krause's stepdaughter married. All of the Bulls assistant coaches and their wives were invited to the wedding, as was Tim Floyd, then the head coach at Iowa State, whom Krause was openly courting as Jackson's successor (and who would eventually succeed Jackson). Jackson and his then wife, June, were not even told of the wedding, much less invited, only finding out about the event when the wife of Cartwright, who by that time had become a Bulls assistant, asked June what she would be wearing to the reception.

After contentious negotiations between Jackson and the Bulls in that same period, Jackson was signed for the 1997–98 season only. Krause announced the signing in what Chicago media widely considered to be a mean-spirited manner, emphasizing that Jackson would not be rehired even if the Bulls won the 1997–98 title. That triggered an argument between Jackson and Krause in which Jackson essentially told Krause that he seemed to be rooting for the other side and not the Bulls. At that point, Krause told Jackson, "I don't care if it's 82-and-0 this year, you're fucking gone." Krause was widely quoted as saying, "Players and coaches don't win championships; organizations win championships." The statement particularly offended Michael Jordan. However, Krause said that his original phrasing was "Players and coaches alone don't win championships; organizations win championships."

Although most of the narrative suggested that Jackson was forced out as head coach, Jackson had actually declined a long-term offer from owner Jerry Reinsdorf. Jackson himself held to a theory that "a coach loses the attention of his players after seven years", being taught by his father Charles, a traveling Pentecostal minister that, "You can only stay in one place five years and then your message starts falling on deaf ears." During Jackson's sixth season as head coach, he told Krause and Reinsdorf that he would only return after his contract expired in 1996 if the team cut loose every player from the first three-peat, including Pippen. Though Jordan did return to basketball after major-league baseball was halted by a strike, only he (having confided to Reinsdorf that he would only play for Jackson) and Pippen remained for the second string of championships. Jordan retired after the 1997-98 season because he was "burned out" shouldering an increasing burden for the team due to Pippen's absence and "babying Rodman".

After the Bulls' final title of the Jordan era in 1998, Jerry Reinsdorf offered Jackson the opportunity to come back the following year as head coach but made it clear that the team would have to go into a rebuild because other than Michael Jordan the rest of the players were at the end of the productive years and the would be too expensive to resign. Jackson refused by saying that he didn't want to coach a bad team and left the team vowing never to coach again, but after he took a year off he decided to give it another chance with the Los Angeles Lakers. Longtime friend of Krause and Bulls assistant coach Tex Winter, who was the architect of the triangle offense, stayed with the Bulls for another full season, leaving the organization in the summer of 1999, when Phil Jackson was hired to coach the Lakers. Krause has said that he had not spoken to Jackson since. When Jordan was inducted into the Hall of Fame in 2009, Krause was not in attendance. Krause said he would not attend the ceremony over the Hall of Fame's refusal to induct Winter. Krause and Jackson briefly put their differences aside when Winter was finally inducted two years later. The two shook hands before the ceremony and conducted themselves in a cordial manner during Winter's segment.

Krause remarked when Jackson became President of the New York Knicks that "Phil didn't take the job because he thought he had a playoff club. He took the job for the money."

Rebuilding
After the 1998 title, deciding that the Bulls were aging and facing an uncertain future, Krause chose to unload the veterans and rebuild. Few major players were added other than from drafts.

The draft brought prolific collegiate players such as Elton Brand, Ron Artest, Marcus Fizer, Jamal Crawford, and Jay Williams to the Bulls but it would be the 2001 draft that stood out. After finishing 15–67 during the 2000–2001 season, Krause decided to trade away his best player in Brand for high schooler Tyson Chandler who was hyped as "the next Kevin Garnett", and draft another high schooler in Eddy Curry who, similarly, was hyped as a slightly smaller version of Shaquille O'Neal, with the fourth overall pick in the draft.

Krause believed that the tandem of Chandler and Curry would develop into elite players and provide the foundation for another dynasty. A mid-season trade the following year brought scorer Jalen Rose to the Bulls in exchange for Brad Miller and Artest which cleared playing time for the two rookies. After drafting Jay Williams during the offseason, the Bulls had a roster with Rose, Crawford, Curry, Chandler, Williams, and Fizer that fulfilled Krause's dream of a talented young athletic team. The Bulls showed some improvement the following year.

Later years and death
In 2003, Krause resigned as general manager. He explained, "The rigors and stress of the job have caused me some minor physical problems in the past few years." The Bulls fell to 23–59 in the next season, and Krause's dream of a talented young athletic team imploded with all of his acquisitions traded or out of the league within three years. Eddy Curry had success in the league, but perhaps did not live up to the lofty expectations that Krause had. Meanwhile, former players Elton Brand, Brad Miller, Ron Artest, and Tyson Chandler became All-Stars for their new teams.

Krause went back to his roots and worked briefly for the New York Yankees as a scout before joining the New York Mets in 2005. In 2010, he rejoined the Chicago White Sox as a scout, a position he had held in the 1970s and 80s. He was appointed by the Arizona Diamondbacks as a special assistant in its scouting department on April 1, 2011.

On March 21, 2017, Krause died at the age of 77. He had been struggling with health issues such as osteomyelitis. He was inducted into the 2017 Basketball Hall of Fame class posthumously.

Bibliography 
Evensen, Bruce J. (November 25, 2021), "Krause, Jerry (6 Apr. 1939–21 Mar. 2017), basketball general manager and scout for basketball and baseball teams", American National Biography Online, Oxford University Press, doi:10.1093/anb/9780198606697.013.370015.

References

1939 births
2017 deaths
Arizona Diamondbacks scouts
Chicago Bulls executives
Chicago White Sox scouts
Jewish American baseball people
Naismith Memorial Basketball Hall of Fame inductees
National Basketball Association general managers
New York Mets scouts
Seattle Mariners scouts
Sportspeople from Chicago
21st-century American Jews